You Taizhong (1918–1998) was a general of the Chinese People's Liberation Army.

Biography 
He was born in Guangshan County, Henan in December 1918. He joined the Chinese Workers' and Peasants' Red Army in January 1931, the Communist Youth League of China in November 1933 and the Chinese Communist Party in June 1934. During the Second Sino-Japanese War, he was a brigade commander in the Eighth Route Army. 

He was later a division commander in the People's Volunteer Army. He was promoted to major general in 1955. He served in the Nanjing, Beijing, Chengdu and Guangzhou Military Regions. During the Cultural Revolution he was Director of the Revolutionary Committee of Inner Mongolia. He retired on September 14, 1988. 

He was a member of the 10th, 11th and 12th Central Committees of the CPC. He was a delegate to the 5th National People's Congress.

References 

1918 births
1998 deaths
People's Liberation Army generals from Henan
People's Republic of China politicians from Henan
Chinese Communist Party politicians from Henan
Political office-holders in Inner Mongolia
Members of the 12th Central Committee of the Chinese Communist Party
Members of the 11th Central Committee of the Chinese Communist Party
Members of the 10th Central Committee of the Chinese Communist Party
Delegates to the 5th National People's Congress
Alternate members of the 9th Central Committee of the Chinese Communist Party
Commanders of the Guangzhou Military Region